Agda may refer to:
 Agda (programming language), the programming language and theorem prover
 Agda (Golgafrinchan), the character in The Hitchhiker's Guide to the Galaxy by Douglas Adams
 Liten Agda, the heroine of a Swedish legend
 Agda Montelius, a Swedish feminist
 Agda Persdotter, a Swedish royal mistress of the 16th-century
 Agda Rössel, a Swedish politician
 Agda Östlund, a Swedish politician